Misha Grewal (born 23 May 1970) is a female Indian former professional squash player who represented India. She reached a career-high world ranking of 27 in March 1995. She was an Indian national champion on four occasions.

She became runners-up to Malaysian player Lynn Leong in the 1996 
Asian Individual Squash Championships, which terms as her career best performance at international level.

References

1970 births
Living people
Indian female squash players
Recipients of the Arjuna Award